Senator Noland may refer to:

Duane Noland (born 1956), Illinois State Senate
Michael Noland (born 1960), Illinois State Senate
Patricia Noland (born 1945), Arizona State Senate

See also
Senator Nolan (disambiguation)